Ansin is a surname. Notable people with the surname include:

Edmund Ansin (1936–2020), American television executive
Toby Lerner Ansin (born 1941), American civic leader, wife of Edmund

See also
Asín (surname)